Quinocitrinines are quinoline alkaloids isolated from a permafrost Penicillium.

Further reading

Penicillium
Quinoline alkaloids
Nitrogen heterocycles